For more detailed character information, see List of House characters.
Below is a list of actors and actresses that are or were part of the cast of the American drama television series House. 

The show's main stars have included, at some point, Hugh Laurie, Lisa Edelstein, Robert Sean Leonard, Omar Epps, Jesse Spencer, Jennifer Morrison, Peter Jacobson, Olivia Wilde, Kal Penn, Amber Tamblyn, Odette Annable, and Charlyne Yi.

Cast

References

External links 
 Full cast and crew of House on the Internet Movie Database

 
Lists of actors by drama television series